Daniel Simonsen is a Norwegian comedian and actor.

Career 
Simonsen has performed at the Edinburgh Festival Fringe since 2009. As well as his Newcomer Award, his show "Champions" received positive reviews, he supported Simon Amstell on his UK tour in 2012 and 2015 and appeared on Russell Howard's Good News in 2012. In 2019 he performed on The Late Show with Stephen Colbert. 

Simonsen has won and been nominated for awards both in Norway and the UK including Chortle Best Newcomer, Best Comedian at Comedy Fight Club and the So You Think You're Funny competition.

Since 2014, he has had a recurring role in Vic and Bob's BBC sitcom House of Fools as Erik.

Filmography

Film

Television

References

External links

Norwegian male comedians
Year of birth missing (living people)
Living people
Actors from Bergen